St Edward's Passage, known in the 18th century as Chain Lane, is a Y-shaped alleyway in Cambridge, England, between King's Parade—opposite the main gate of King's College—and Peas Hill. It houses the entrance and churchyard of the Church of St Edward King and Martyr; the Cambridge Arts Theatre; several cottages; G. David, an independent bookshop run from the same building since 1896; a few businesses; and student accommodation. It is a narrow, dark lane, with riven-stone paving, which opens out onto the much wider and sunnier King's Parade.

Excavations on the southern side in 1995 suggested that the lane had been established by the 13th century. It is marked on Richard Lyne's map of the city from 1574, the earliest known map of Cambridge, and on John Hammond's from 1592. According to Cambridge City Council, it "preserv[es] a sense of the cheek-by-jowl nature of the early town".

Buildings

St Edward King and Martyr
The entrance of St Edward King and Martyr, which dates to the early 13th century, is on  St Edward's Passage, at the Peas Hill end. Its small churchyard lies between the two arms of the alley.

Calling itself the cradle of the English Reformation—a period of religious upheaval in the 16th century, when the English Church opposed the authority of the Roman Catholic Church—the church contains the original pulpit from which the Protestant reformers Robert Barnes (1495–1540), Thomas Bilney (1495–1531) and Hugh Latimer (1487–1555) preached. During midnight mass in the church on 24 December 1525, Barnes, an Augustinian friar who became a Lutheran, gave the first sermon in which a reformer accused the Catholic Church of heresy. Historian Alec Ryrie referred to it as "the first set-piece confrontation of the English Reformation". Barnes, Bilney and Latimer were eventually burned at the stake.

Other buildings
Most of the buildings are brick fronted, date from the late 18th and early 19th century, and have vertically hung sash windows. Several (nos. 3, 4, 8–10, 12–15, 15a and 16) are Grade II-listed buildings.

The Cambridge Arts Theatre and the Venue (a restaurant) are at no. 6, the Indigo Coffee House at no. 8, and the Haunted Bookshop at no. 9. The building at no. 10 has Gothic detailing and was originally built for the Church of England's Young Men's Society; it now houses the Corpus Christi College Playroom (a theatre). The building at nos. 12–15, a lime-washed two-storey brick building dating to the late 18th and early 19th century, is used for student accommodation. G. David, established in 1896 by Gustave David (1860–1936) and known as David's bookshop, is at no. 16. There is also a row of late 18th-century two-storey cottages.

Status, age and type

Gallery

See also

Grade II* listed buildings in Cambridge
Grade II* listed buildings in Cambridgeshire
Marian persecutions
White Horse Tavern, Cambridge

Notes

References

Further reading

Cargill Thompson, W. D. J. (1960). "The Sixteenth-Century Editions of A Supplication unto King Henry the Eighth by Robert Barnes", Transactions of the Cambridge Bibliographical Society , 3(2), pp. 133–142. 
Glover, T. R. (2015) [1937]. David of Cambridge. Cambridge: Cambridge University Press.
Rex, Richard (December 1999). "The Early Impact of Reformation Theology at Cambridge University, 1521-1547". Reformation and Renaissance Review, 2(1), pp. 38–71. 

13th-century establishments in England
Culture of the University of Cambridge
Grade II listed buildings in Cambridge
Streets in Cambridge